Riudovelles is a hamlet located in the municipality of Tàrrega, in Province of Lleida province, Catalonia, Spain. As of 2020, it has a population of 10.

Geography 
Riudovelles is located 63km east of Lleida.

References

Populated places in the Province of Lleida